George Bridgeman may refer to:

George Bridgeman, 2nd Earl of Bradford (1789–1865), British peer
George Bridgeman, 4th Earl of Bradford (1845–1915), British soldier and peer

See also
George Bridgman (1864–1943), American artist, author and teacher
George Soudon Bridgman, architect and civil engineer